Bouvier may refer to:

People
Bouvier, a French surname, is the last name of several notable people:
 Augustus Jules Bouvier, English artist
 Charles Bouvier, Swiss bobsledder
 Edith Bouvier, aunt of Jacqueline Kennedy Onassis; appeared in the documentary film  Grey Gardens (1975)
 Eugène Louis Bouvier, French zoologist
 Hélène Bouvier, French mezzo-soprano
  Jacqueline Kennedy Onassis (née Bouvier), (1929–1994), the First Lady to John F. Kennedy, 35th president of the United States of America
 Janet Lee Bouvier (1907–1989), mother of Jacqueline Kennedy Onassis and Lee Radziwill
 Jean-Baptiste Bouvier (1783–1854), French theologian and Bishop of Le Mans 
 Jeanne Bouvier (1865–1964), a French textile worker and trade unionist
 John Bouvier (1787–1851), American jurist and compiler of famous law dictionary
 John Vernou Bouvier III ("Black Jack"), stockbroker and father of Jacqueline Kennedy Onassis and Lee Radziwill
 Lee Radziwill (née Bouvier) (1933–2019), sister of Jacqueline Kennedy Onassis
 Nicolas Bouvier (1929–1998), Swiss writer and traveller
 Pierre Bouvier (born 1979), musician

Fictional characters
Anthony Bouvier, fictional character on the TV series Designing Women
 Pam Bouvier, fictional character (Bond girl) in the James Bond film Licence to Kill (1989)
 Bouvier is the last name of several fictional characters from the television series The Simpsons by Matt Groening:

 Clancy Bouvier, Marge Simpson's deceased father
 Jacqueline Ingrid Bouvier, Marge's mother
 Ling Bouvier, Marge's niece and Selma's adopted daughter
 Marge Simpson (née Bouvier)
 Patty and Selma Bouvier, Marge's sisters
 See also: Extended Bouvier family on The Simpsons

Breeds of dog
 Bouvier Bernois (Bernese Mountain Dog)
 Bouvier des Ardennes
 Bouvier des Flandres

Other uses
 Bouvier (grape), wine-grape variety grown primarily in Austria, Hungary and Slovenia
 Bouvier's Law Dictionary

See also